The Wireless Set No. 18 was a HF portable man-pack radio transceiver used by the British Army during World War II. Frequency coverage was 6 to 9MHz with an RF output of 0.25W. Range was up to 10 miles.

References

External links

World War II British electronics
British military radio